Van Kessel is a Dutch toponymic surname meaning "from/of Kessel". There are two towns Kessel in Belgium, two in The Netherlands, and one just across the border in Germany. It could also refer to the medieval  with Kessel (Limburg) as its capital, or the extended  that existed until 1675. Notable people with the surname include:

Corné van Kessel (born 1991), Dutch cyclo-cross cyclist 
Ferdinand van Kessel (1648–1696), Flemish painter, son of Jan the Elder
Gino van Kessel (born 1993), Curaçaoan footballer
Henk van Kessel (born 1946), Dutch motorcycle racer
Jan van Kessel (Amsterdam) (1641–1680), Dutch painter
Jan van Kessel the Elder (1626–1679), Flemish painter
Jan van Kessel the Younger (1654–1708), Flemish court painter in Spain, son of the above
'the other' Jan van Kessel (c.1620–1661), Flemish still life painter
Jan Thomas van Kessel (1677–1741), a Flemish painter
John Van Kessel (born 1969), Canadian ice hockey player
Lieve van Kessel (born 1977), Dutch field hockey player
Peter van Kessel (c. 1635–1668), Flemish still life painter
Peter van Kessel (historian) (born 1933), Dutch historian
Theodor van Kessel (1620 – 1696), Flemish engraver

See also 
 Kessel (surname)

References

Dutch-language surnames
Surnames of Dutch origin
Toponymic surnames